= Theater Kosmos =

Theatre in Vorarlberg, Austria

Coordinates: 47°29′44″N 9°43′47″E

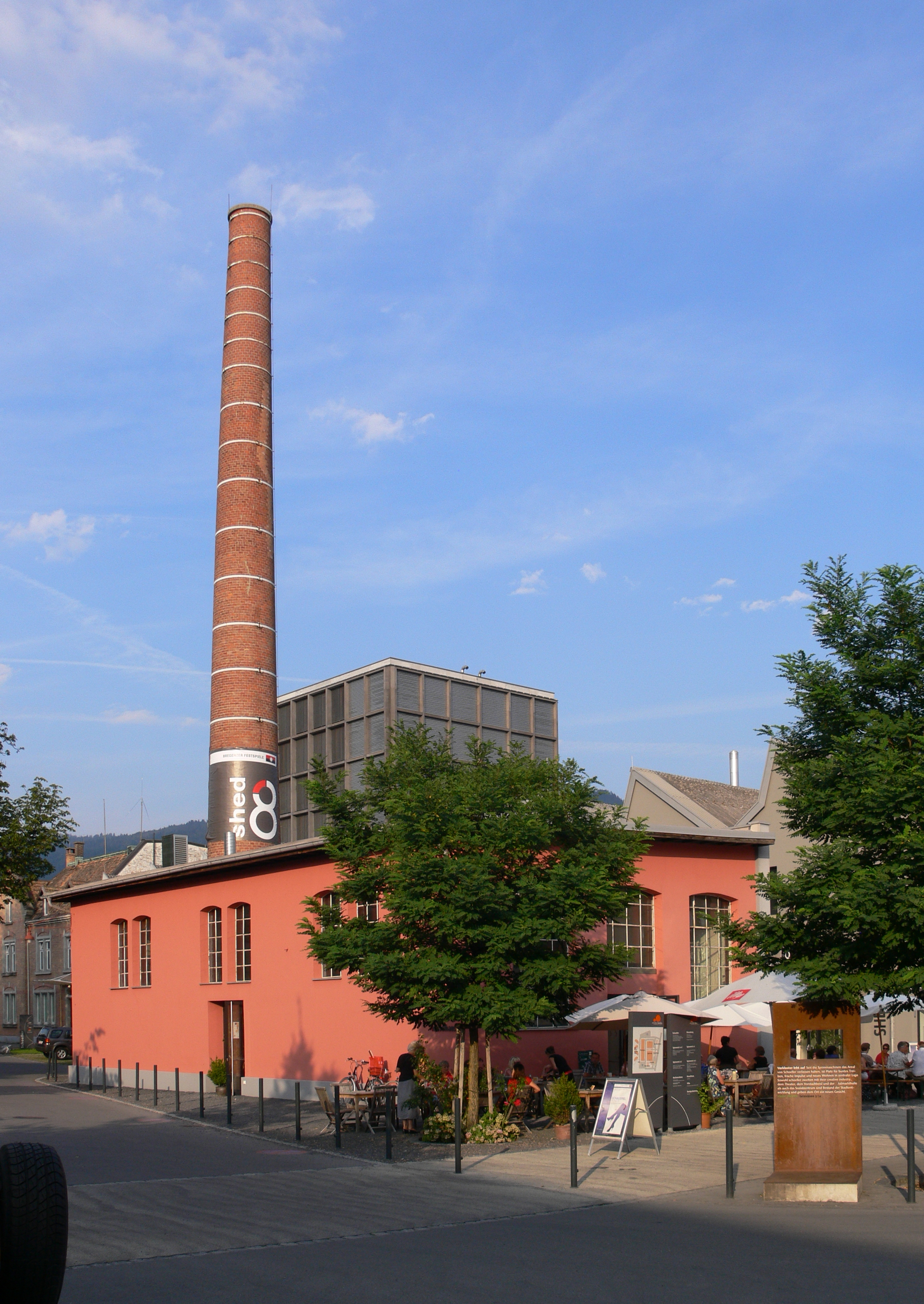
An image of Theater Kosmos

Theater Kosmos is a theatre in Austria.

== Theater Kosmos ==
Theater Kosmos is a theatre company based in Bregenz, Austria, established in 1996 by Augustin Jagg and Hubert Dragaschnig. It is known for staging contemporary plays and supporting new theatrical works, including Austrian premieres and commissioned productions. The theatre frequently engages with political and social themes and has become a recognized venue for innovative stage work in the region.

The company is publicly funded and participates in regional cultural initiatives, contributing to the broader Austrian theatre landscape
